Jakati may be:

Jakati language
Shadab Jakati